The 1994–95 New York Rangers season was the franchise's 69th season. The season was shortened to 48 games due to the 1994–95 NHL lockout.

For the third time in as many years, the Rangers started the season with a different head coach. Mike Keenan, who had led the team to the Stanley Cup one year earlier, left to become head coach and general manager of the St. Louis Blues under controversial circumstances. Colin Campbell was hired to replace him and the Blues sent Petr Nedved to the Rangers as compensation for Keenan, with Doug Lidster and Esa Tikkanen sent to St. Louis with their former coach.

The Rangers barely qualified for the playoffs in the shortened season, finishing one point ahead of the Florida Panthers for the last spot in the Eastern Conference. The team advanced to the second round of the playoffs, where they fell in a sweep to the Philadelphia Flyers.

Regular season

Final standings

Schedule and results

|- align="center" bgcolor="#FFBBBB"
| 1 || 20 || Buffalo Sabres || 2 - 1 || 0-1-0
|- align="center" bgcolor="#CCFFCC"
| 2 || 21 || Montreal Canadiens || 5 - 2 || 1-1-0
|- align="center" bgcolor="#FFBBBB"
| 3 || 23 || Boston Bruins || 2 - 1 || 1-2-0
|- align="center" bgcolor="#FFBBBB"
| 4 || 25 || Pittsburgh Penguins || 3 - 2 || 1-3-0
|- align="center" bgcolor="#FFBBBB"
| 5 || 28 || @ Quebec Nordiques || 2 - 0 || 1-4-0
|- align="center" bgcolor="#CCFFCC"
| 6 || 30 || Ottawa Senators || 6 - 2 || 2-4-0
|-

|- align="center" bgcolor="#FFBBBB"
| 7 || 1 || @ Pittsburgh Penguins || 4 - 3 || 2-5-0
|- align="center" bgcolor="white"
| 8 || 2 || Tampa Bay Lightning || 3 - 3 OT || 2-5-1
|- align="center" bgcolor="#CCFFCC"
| 9 || 4 || @ Ottawa Senators || 2 - 1 || 3-5-1
|- align="center" bgcolor="#CCFFCC"
| 10 || 8 || Washington Capitals || 5 - 4 || 4-5-1
|- align="center" bgcolor="#FFBBBB"
| 11 || 9 || @ New Jersey Devils || 4 - 1 || 4-6-1
|- align="center" bgcolor="#CCFFCC"
| 12 || 11 || @ Tampa Bay Lightning || 3 - 2 || 5-6-1
|- align="center" bgcolor="#CCFFCC"
| 13 || 15 || @ Buffalo Sabres || 2 - 1 || 6-6-1
|- align="center" bgcolor="white"
| 14 || 16 || Montreal Canadiens || 2 - 2 OT || 6-6-2
|- align="center" bgcolor="#FFBBBB"
| 15 || 18 || @ Montreal Canadiens || 5 - 2 || 6-7-2
|- align="center" bgcolor="#CCFFCC"
| 16 || 20 || @ Tampa Bay Lightning || 3 - 1 || 7-7-2
|- align="center" bgcolor="#CCFFCC"
| 17 || 21 || @ Florida Panthers || 5 - 3 || 8-7-2
|- align="center" bgcolor="#FFBBBB"
| 18 || 24 || Hartford Whalers || 2 - 1 || 8-8-2
|- align="center" bgcolor="#CCFFCC"
| 19 || 26 || @ Buffalo Sabres || 4 - 2 || 9-8-2
|- align="center" bgcolor="white"
| 20 || 28 || Florida Panthers || 0 - 0 OT || 9-8-3
|-

|- align="center" bgcolor="#CCFFCC"
| 21 || 1 || @ Hartford Whalers || 5 - 2 || 10-8-3
|- align="center" bgcolor="#CCFFCC"
| 22 || 3 || Philadelphia Flyers || 5 - 3 || 11-8-3
|- align="center" bgcolor="#FFBBBB"
| 23 || 5 || @ Washington Capitals || 4 - 2 || 11-9-3
|- align="center" bgcolor="#CCFFCC"
| 24 || 6 || Ottawa Senators || 4 - 3 || 12-9-3
|- align="center" bgcolor="#CCFFCC"
| 25 || 8 || New Jersey Devils || 6 - 4 || 13-9-3
|- align="center" bgcolor="#FFBBBB"
| 26 || 11 || @ Montreal Canadiens || 3 - 1 || 13-10-3
|- align="center" bgcolor="#FFBBBB"
| 27 || 15 || Philadelphia Flyers || 4 - 3 || 13-11-3
|- align="center" bgcolor="#FFBBBB"
| 28 || 18 || @ Washington Capitals || 4 - 1 || 13-12-3
|- align="center" bgcolor="#FFBBBB"
| 29 || 22 || New Jersey Devils || 5 - 2 || 13-13-3
|- align="center" bgcolor="#FFBBBB"
| 30 || 23 || @ New York Islanders || 1 - 0 || 13-14-3
|- align="center" bgcolor="#FFBBBB"
| 31 || 25 || @ Quebec Nordiques || 2 - 1 || 13-15-3
|- align="center" bgcolor="#FFBBBB"
| 32 || 30 || Quebec Nordiques || 5 - 4 || 13-16-3
|-

|- align="center" bgcolor="#CCFFCC"
| 33 || 1 || @ Boston Bruins || 3 - 2 || 14-16-3
|- align="center" bgcolor="#FFBBBB"
| 34 || 2 || @ Philadelphia Flyers || 4 - 2 || 14-17-3
|- align="center" bgcolor="#CCFFCC"
| 35 || 5 || @ Florida Panthers || 5 - 0 || 15-17-3
|- align="center" bgcolor="#FFBBBB"
| 36 || 7 || New York Islanders || 4 - 3 || 15-18-3
|- align="center" bgcolor="#FFBBBB"
| 37 || 9 || @ New Jersey Devils || 2 - 0 || 15-19-3
|- align="center" bgcolor="#CCFFCC"
| 38 || 12 || Buffalo Sabres || 3 - 1 || 16-19-3
|- align="center" bgcolor="#CCFFCC"
| 39 || 14 || Boston Bruins || 5 - 3 || 17-19-3
|- align="center" bgcolor="#CCFFCC"
| 40 || 16 || @ New York Islanders || 3 - 2 || 18-19-3
|- align="center" bgcolor="#FFBBBB"
| 41 || 18 || @ Pittsburgh Penguins || 6 - 5 || 18-20-3
|- align="center" bgcolor="#CCFFCC"
| 42 || 20 || Hartford Whalers || 3 - 2 || 19-20-3
|- align="center" bgcolor="#FFBBBB"
| 43 || 23 || @ Boston Bruins || 5 - 4 || 19-21-3
|- align="center" bgcolor="#CCFFCC"
| 44 || 24 || Washington Capitals || 5 - 4 || 20-21-3
|- align="center" bgcolor="#CCFFCC"
| 45 || 26 || Tampa Bay Lightning || 6 - 4 || 21-21-3
|- align="center" bgcolor="#FFBBBB"
| 46 || 28 || New York Islanders || 4 - 2 || 21-22-3
|- align="center" bgcolor="#CCFFCC"
| 47 || 30 || @ Philadelphia Flyers || 2 - 0 || 22-22-3
|-

|- align="center" bgcolor="#FFBBBB"
| 48 || 2 || Florida Panthers || 4 - 3 || 22-23-3
|-

Playoffs

The Rangers faced the first-place Quebec Nordiques in the first round of the playoffs. They narrowly lost Game 1, 5–4, as the Nordiques were powered by Joe Sakic's hat-trick. New York came back in game 2, winning 8–3. Sergei Nemchinov and Petr Nedved each scored twice. After edging the Nordiques 4–3 in Game 3, the Rangers found themselves trailing 2–0 in Game 4. They would tie it up on goals by Brian Leetch and Alexei Kovalev. Steve Larmer scored the winner at 8:09 of the first overtime period. Facing elimination, the Nordiques played a determined Game 5 at home and won 4–2 to cut New York's lead in the series to 3–2. The Rangers, at home for Game 6, built up a 4–0 lead and ended up winning 4–2, to eliminate the Nordiques four games to two. The Nordiques moved to Colorado almost immediately, as the announcement came on May 25, 1995.

In the second round, the Rangers faced a determined Philadelphia Flyers team that was led by the "Legion of Doom" line. In Game 1, the Rangers jumped out to a 2–0 lead after the first period on power-play goals by Brian Leetch and Petr Nedved. With the help of John LeClair's hat trick, the Flyers took a 4–3 lead in the third period. With only 19 seconds remaining, Pat Verbeek tied the game at 4–4. However, it was the Flyers who would ultimately win the game, as Eric Desjardins scored at 7:03 of the first overtime period. Game 2 started nearly identically to Game 1, as New York led 2–0 after the first period on power-play goals. Both were scored by Brian Leetch. Philadelphia re-gained control of the game as they had in Game 1, leading 3–2 midway through the third period. With under eight minutes to go, Leetch completed his hat trick to tie the score at 3–3. This game also went into overtime, and the Flyers needed only 25 seconds to win it, as defenseman Kevin Haller scored his 3rd of the playoffs to give Philadelphia a 2–0 lead in the series. The Flyers went on to dominate Games 3 and 4 at Madison Square Garden in New York, winning 5–2 and 4–1 to complete the sweep.

Key:  Win  Loss

Player statistics
Skaters

Goaltenders

†Denotes player spent time with another team before joining Rangers. Stats reflect time with Rangers only.
‡Traded mid-season. Stats reflect time with Rangers only.

Transactions
July 24, 1994 – Doug Lidster was traded by the New York Rangers, along with Esa Tikkanen, to the St. Louis Blues in exchange for Petr Nedved.
March 23, 1995 – Hartford obtained D Glen Featherstone, D Michael Stewart and a first-round pick in the 1995 Entry Draft (Jean-Sebastien Giguere) and a fourth-round pick in the 1996 Entry Draft in exchange for RW Pat Verbeek.

Draft picks
New York's picks at the 1994 NHL Entry Draft in Hartford, Connecticut, at the Hartford Civic Center.

References

External links
 Rangers on Hockey Database

New York Rangers seasons
New York Rangers
New York Rangers
New York Rangers
New York Rangers
1990s in Manhattan
Madison Square Garden